Saan Ka Man Naroroon (English: Wherever You Are) is a 1993 Filipino romantic melodrama film directed by Carlos Siguion-Reyna and starring Richard Gomez, Dawn Zulueta, Sharmaine Arnaiz, and Charito Solis. The screenplay by Raquel Villavicencio is inspired by the 1970 Italian drama film Sunflower directed by Vittorio de Sica and starring Sophia Loren and Marcello Mastroianni. Saan Ka Man Naroroon reunited Gomez and Zulueta with Siguion-Reyna, who directed them in Hihintayin Kita Sa Langit. This film would be the last full-length project teaming Gomez and Zulueta. 

In 2019, the film was digitally restored by ABS-CBN Film Restoration and Central Digital Lab, Inc. and subsequently re-released in select theaters.

Plot 
Much to his mother Elena's (Charito Solis) chagrin, Miguel (Richard Gomez) marries bar singer Amanda (Dawn Zulueta). Nevertheless, in order to appease his mother, Miguel tells Amanda that he promised his mother that Amanda would change and become a more proper wife.

Soon after, Miguel sets off with his friends, Vic (Iman Esturco) and Danny (Archie Adamos), to mine gold with the hopes that he can earn enough to finish building a new home for Amanda and himself so that they no longer have to live with his exacting mother. On their journey, the group are ambushed by bandits. Miguel is left for dead. He is found by a lonely and orphaned young woman, Cita (Sharmaine Arnaiz), who nurses him back to health. After going through his bag, however, Cita hides Miguel's wedding band and wallet, which contained a photo of Amanda. When Miguel regains consciousness, he has no recollection of his life nor even of who he is. Cita decides to call him "Martin" after her late father. While living with Cita, Miguel is haunted by memories of a mysterious woman, although they are not enough to recall Amanda nor his life in any full detail.

Meanwhile, Amanda and Elena visit Danny in the hospital. Danny tells the two women that he saw Vic and Miguel die in the bandit attack. Elena blames Amanda for her son's supposed death, while Amanda refuses to believe Miguel is dead without seeing a body and resolves to find him. After searching relentlessly through the province, Amanda shows a photo of Miguel to someone who recognizes him as "Martin". She is bought to a house where she meets a pregnant Cita.

Upon seeing Amanda, Miguel's memory suddenly returns, but when he tries to reach out to her, his distraught wife takes off. She throws away her wedding band and burns down the frame of the house that Miguel had been building for them. Ruben (Richard Quan), who has had his eye on Amanda since her singing days, takes the opportunity to go after her. When Miguel goes into town, he finds Amanda back to singing at the bar and now involved with Ruben. Miguel tries to talk to Amanda but she remains upset at him for not trying to find out who he was while she was able to find him. She refuses to accept him back into her life. A dejected Miguel returns to Cita.

One day, Miguel finds the wedding band and wallet that Cita hid. When he confronts her, she says she did it because she loves him and begs him to stay. In the middle of their argument, Cita feels the baby coming. She gives birth to their child but dies soon after. With her last breath, Cita thanks Miguel for the time they had together. Miguel again returns to town and sees Amanda, who is now prostituting herself, saying she was always seen as trash anyways. Begging his Amanda for a second chance, Miguel admits that he did not search for who he was because he was weak and afraid of the life that he may have found. Amanda exclaims that it is too late, she is ruined and past redemption, but Miguel promises that this time he will not leave her. Accepting each other for who they are, the couple reconcile to raise Miguel and Cita's child as their own.

Cast

Production 
Much of the film was shot on location in Ilocos Norte and Ilocos Sur. The baroque Paoay Church of Ilocos Norte was featured in a scene.

Music 
The theme song "Saan Ka Man Naroroon" was performed by Rachel Alejandro with an arrangement by Ryan Cayabyab. The love song was originally written in 1968 by Restie Umali with lyrics by Levi Celerio.

Reception 
The film was screened at the 1994 Toronto International Film Festival. Emanuel Levy of Variety concluded "helmer Siguin-Reyna shows talent for controlling the production's physical aspects, orchestrating a fluid narrative style, and eliciting proficient performances from his attractive cast."

Accolades

References

External links 

 Wherever You Are at IMDb

Philippine romantic drama films
Films based on works by Cesare Zavattini
Remakes of Italian films